Daryl Watts (born May 15, 1999) is a Canadian women's ice hockey player for the Toronto Six of the Premier Hockey Federation. She previously played in the NCAA, two seasons each for the Boston College Eagles and the Wisconsin Badgers. Watts was awarded the 21st Patty Kazmaier Award, becoming the first freshman player to win the award. Watts finished the season with 82 points, which led all competitors in NCAA women's ice hockey.

Playing career

Hockey Canada
Watts was a member of Canada’s entry at the 2016 IIHF U18 Women’s World Championships in St. Catharine’s, Ontario. Her first appearance in a Hockey Canada jersey took place in August 2015 as Canada’s National Women’s Under-18 Team challenged the United States in a three-game series in Lake Placid, New York.

In the gold medal game of the 2017 IIHF U18 Women’s World Championships, contested at PSG Arena in Zlin, Czech Republic, Watts scored a goal for Canada in the third period, their first of the game. Although said goal would tie the game, the US would score twice in the final three minutes, prevailing in a 3-1 final.

NCAA

Boston College
Becoming the first freshman to win the Patty Kazmaier Award, Watts beat out finalists (and fellow Canadians) Victoria Bach of Boston University and Loren Gabel of Clarkson University. Of note, she became the second Patty Kazmaier Award winner in Eagles history, following Alexandra Carpenter, who captured the honor in 2015. Watts’ end-to-end shorthanded goal against the University of New Hampshire was also recognized among the BC Eagles Athletics’ Top 10 Plays of the 2017-18 season, placing second. During her freshman season she led the NCAA in scoring and recorded 42 goals and 40 assists in 38 games. Her 2.16 points per game ranked first in the NCAA, while her 10 power play goals tied for best in the NCAA. Following an outstanding season she won both the Hockey East Player and Rookie of the Year Awards. She became only the second player in conference history to do so, tying a mark set by former Boston College player Kelli Stack in 2006. She was also named the Women's Hockey Commissioners Association National Rookie of the Year.

Wisconsin
In May 2019, Watts decided to enter the transfer portal and leave Boston College hockey. On June 10, 2019 she transferred to Wisconsin. During the 2019–20 season, she set a program record for most assists in one season with 49, while leading the NCAA with 74 points.

Appearing in the 2021 NCAA National Collegiate Women's Ice Hockey Tournament versus the Northeastern Huskies, Daryl Watts scored the game-winning goal in a 2-1 overtime win. With the win, the Badgers captured their sixth national championship in program history. It was part of a landmark 2020–21 season which saw Watts as a top-three finalist for the Patty Kazmaier Award, as she led the NCAA in goals scored and placed second nationally with 34 points.

Premier Hockey Federation

Toronto Six
On January 19, 2023, Watts signed a 2-year contract with the Toronto Six of the Premier Hockey Federation. On January 25, 2023, it was revealed that her contract carried an average annual value of $88,500 US ($118,000+ CDN) thereby making it "the highest salary ever announced for a professional women's hockey player in North America". On January 26, 2023, Watts revealed that her 2023-24 salary would be a league record $150,000 US.

Personal life
Watts was born and raised in Toronto. Her father, Michael, is a corporate lawyer who also acted as her daughter's agent when negotiating her PHF contract.

Career statistics

Hockey Canada

NCAA

Awards and honours
2018 Boston College Athletics Female Rookie of the Year Award
2018 Cammi Granato Award, awarded to Women's Hockey East Player of the Year
2018 Hockey East Rookie of the Year
2018 Women's Hockey Commissioners Association National Rookie of the Year
2017-18 First Team Hockey East
2018 Patty Kazmaier Award
National Rookie of the Month Award, January 2018
CCM/AHCA 2018-19 Second Team All-American
CCM/AHCA 2019-20 Second Team All-American
2019-20 NCAA scoring champion (74 points)
2019-20 Wisconsin Badgers Offensive Player of the Year honors: (tied with Abby Roque).
2020-21 NCAA leader: points per game (1.79) 
2020-21 NCAA leader: goals per game (0.89) 
2020-21 NCAA leader (tied): goals (17) 
2020-21 WCHA leader: game-winning goals (4) 
2020-21 WCHA Player of the Year
Top-three Finalist: 2021 Patty Kazmaier Award
CCM/AHCA 2020-21 First Team All-American
2020-21 All-USCHO.com First Team
Hockey Commissioners Association Women’s Player of the Month (March 2021):

References

External links

1999 births
Boston College Eagles women's ice hockey players
Canadian women's ice hockey forwards
Living people
Patty Kazmaier Award winners
Ice hockey people from Toronto
Toronto Six players
Wisconsin Badgers women's ice hockey players